Borrowing base is an accounting metric used by financial institutions to estimate the available collateral on a borrower's assets in order to evaluate the size of the credit that may be extended. Typically, the calculation of borrowing base is used for revolving loans, and the borrowing base determines the maximum credit line available to the borrower. Occasionally, borrowing base is also used to determine the maximum size of a term loan. Depending on the contractual terms of the loan, the assets included in the calculation of the borrowing base may be used as collateral for the loan.

Calculation

For corporations and small businesses 
Borrowing base is frequently used for asset-based commercial loans offered by banks to corporations and small businesses. In this case, borrowing base of a business is typically calculated of corporation's accounts receivable and of its inventory. Work in process is excluded from borrowing base. In addition, also excluded are the accounts receivable from bankrupt customers and accounts receivable that are too old – usually over 90 days past due (in some cases over 120 days past due.)

Different proportions (or 'advance rates') of accounts receivable and of the inventory are included into borrowing base. Typical industry standards are 75–85% for accounts receivable and 25–60% for inventory, and the advance rates can vary dramatically depending on the circumstances.

Lenders' methods of assessment of the inventory value vary. A lender can hire an independent contractor to evaluate borrower's inventory or use averaging, adjusted for a particular industry. For example, Moody's is reportedly applying Monte-Carlo method over inventory price fluctuations within each industry to determine risk free advance rates.

Past due accounts payable are typically subtracted from the borrowing base.

In case of revolving loans, lenders demand periodic recalculations of borrowing base and subsequently adjust the credit limit. Traditionally, banks recalculated borrowing base for businesses yearly, biannually, or monthly. In recent years, however, such 'fixed' borrowing base is deemed risky, as company's assets fluctuate in time. This consideration and the advancement of computer technology prompted weekly and daily recalculations of borrowing base. Regardless of the need of a loan, recurrent calculations of its own borrowing base is currently one of the accounting best practices.

For financial institutions 
Borrowing base of financial institutions who themselves apply for asset-based revolving loans is calculated by summing up all tangible working assets (typically cash, bonds, stocks, etc.) and subtracting from it all senior debt, i.e. all other accumulated debt that does not rank behind other debt for repayment in the event of a liquidation.

For government organizations 
Borrowing base of government organizations is calculated similar to that of corporations. However, in many cases there are government restrictions on pledges of some or all of the accounts receivable. Such accounts receivable are excluded from the borrowing base.

Borrowing base certificates 

Borrowing base certificate is the official accounting document prepared by the borrower that certifies the size of the borrowing base of an organization with the previously agreed advance rates. Borrowing base certificate includes a summary calculation sheet. In its paper form, a borrowing base certificate is signed by the authorized representative of the organization, typically by the organization's CFO, as errors in the calculation of borrowing base can result in various penalties (loan interest rate increase, demand of early loan repayment, etc.)

As lenders demand the submission of borrowing base certificates more frequently (weekly or even daily), software applications become available that can automate these submissions. For example, BBC Easy application automates these submissions for small businesses.

Junior and senior borrowing bases 
Junior borrowing base and senior borrowing base are calculated for the financial institutions and large corporations which have structured debt. In these cases, senior borrowing base is associated with senior debt and calculated of all assets. On the other hand, junior borrowing base is associated with junior debt and calculated of assets that are not already pledged for senior debts. Thus junior borrowing base is always smaller than senior borrowing base.

See also 
 Asset-based lending

References

Literature cited

Debt
Corporate finance